Like all municipalities of Puerto Rico, Añasco is subdivided into administrative units called barrios, which are roughly comparable to minor civil divisions, (and means wards or boroughs or neighborhoods in English). The barrios and subbarrios, in turn, are further subdivided into smaller local populated place areas/units called sectores (sectors in English). The types of sectores may vary, from normally sector to urbanización to reparto to barriada to residencial, among others. Some sectors appear in two barrios.

List of sectors by barrio

Añasco Abajo
Pozo Hondo
Sector El Puente
Sector La Pista

Añasco Arriba
Carretera 109
Extensión Brisas de Añasco
Jardines de Añasco
Sector Nicolás Soto Ramos
Urbanización Brisas de Añasco
Urbanización Sixto Nieto

Añasco barrio-pueblo

Casco del Pueblo
Edificio Diego Salcedo
Edificio Francis Villages Elderly
Edificio Victoria
Urbanización Carlos Feria
Urbanización Los Maestros
Urbanización Villas de Añasco

Caguabo
Condominio Playa Almirante
Sector La Ferrer
Sector La Tosca
Sector Las Curvas de Rincón

Caracol
Carretera 402
Sector Agustín Matías
Sector Cabo Díaz
Sector Calzadera
Sector Caracol Abajo
Sector Caracol Arriba
Sector La Variante
Sector Pepe Pratts
Sector Peyo Valentín

Carreras
Edificio Paseo del Río

Casey Abajo
Carretera 406

Casey Arriba
Sector Mata y Orsini
Sector Pepe Traval

Cerro Gordo
Camino Los Tres Reyes Magos
Carretera 405

Cidra
Carretera 109
Sector La Cuchilla
Sector La Sabana

Corcovada
Carretera 109

Dagüey
Barrio Dagüey Arriba
Calle Dagüey
Calle Victoria
Carretera 404
Extensión Sagrado Corazón
Extensión San Antonio
Imperial Court
Parcelas Ajíes
Residencial Francisco Figueroa
Sector Ajíes
Sector Dagüey
Urbanización Jardines de Dagüey
Urbanización Los Flamboyanes
Urbanización Reparto Dagüey
Urbanización Sagrado Corazón
Urbanización San Antonio

Espino
Carretera 109
Parcelas de Josefa
Sector Solares Lorenzo Rivera
Sector Valle Hermoso
Urbanización Alturas de Añasco

Hatillo
Agrones
Edificio La Sirena
Goyo Carrero
Sector La Ferrer
Sector La Variante
Sector Peyo Valentín

Humatas
Carretera 109
Carretera 405
Lorenzo Rivera
Pagán
Ramal 4402
Sector Luis Mercado
Urbanización Alturas de Librada
Urbanización Colinas de Libradas
Urbanización Estancia de Santa María
Urbanización Estancia Valle Verde
Urbanización Lirios del Valle
Urbanización Rocío del Valle
Urbanización Vista del Río
Urbanización Vistas del Río Apartments
Villa Avilés

Marías
Barrio Marías Arriba
Carretera 402
Extensión Los Flamboyanes
Parcelas Marías
Sector El Salto
Sector La Variante
Sector Valle Hermoso
Urbanización Jardines de la Encantada
Urbanización Valle Real

Miraflores
Carretera 109

Ovejas
Égida Sendero de Amor
Extensión Aquilino
Parcelas Aquilino
Ramal 4430
Reparto Rosario
Sector Camino Arrarás
Sector Picheto Flores
Tramo Carretera 430

Piñales
Piñales Tino Matías
Sector Cuesta Juan Vega
Sector Hacienda Libertad
Sector La Choza
Sector Piñales Abajo
Sector Piñales Arriba
Urbanización Mansiones de Añasco
Urbanización Paseo del Valle
Urbanización Valle de Añasco

Playa
Parcelas Playa
Reparto Los Robles
Sector La Puente
Sector La Vía
Sector Tres Hermanos
Sector Urbanización

Quebrada Larga
Barrio Quebrada Larga Arriba (Sector La Cadena)
Sector Sierra Maestra
Urbanización Estancias de Sierra Maestra

Río Arriba
There are no sectors in Río Arriba barrio.

Río Cañas
There are no sectors in Río Cañas barrio.

See also

 List of communities in Puerto Rico

References

Añasco
Añasco